Western heights is the name of three places in New Zealand:
 Western Heights, a suburb of Auckland
 Western Heights, a suburb of Hamilton
 Western Heights, a suburb of Rotorua